George Emerson Dickman (November 12, 1914 – April 27, 1981) was a pitcher in Major League Baseball who played his entire career for the Boston Red Sox (1936, 1938–1941). He was born in Buffalo, New York.

A two-sport star at Washington and Lee University, Dickman was one of many major leaguers who saw his baseball career interrupted when he joined the Navy during World War II. 
 
In a five-season career, Dickman posted a 22–15 record with 126 strikeouts and a 5.33 ERA and in 125 appearances, including 24 starts, six complete games, one shutout, eight saves and 349.2 innings pitched.

Following his playing retirement, Dickman became a highly respected coach at Princeton University for three years. His 1949–51 teams won two Eastern League championships and tied one, as the 1951 team reached the College World Series in Omaha, Nebraska, the only World Series the school has reached.

Dickman was regularly ribbed for his resemblance to film star Robert Taylor. Dickman died in New York City, New York, at the age of 66.

Head coaching record

References

 Princeton University

External links

 Baseball Library
 Retrosheet
 

1914 births
1981 deaths
Major League Baseball pitchers
Boston Red Sox players
Princeton Tigers baseball coaches
United States Navy personnel of World War II
Washington and Lee Generals baseball players
Baseball players from Buffalo, New York
Rocky Mount Red Sox players
Little Rock Travelers players
Louisville Colonels (minor league) players